Konstantinos Papadakis (born October 2, 1972 in Heraklion, Crete, Greece) is a Greek pianist. He has received the Golden Medal of superior talent. He has performed in worldwide major concert halls such as Carnegie Hall and Wigmore Hall. He studied with Anthony di Bonaventura at Boston University. Three years later, he joined the piano faculty at Boston University and was later appointed a "Samuel Barber" Artist in Residence at West Chester University of Pennsylvania where he remained for five years. In 2011 he joined the piano faculty of the New England Conservatory's Pre-College Division in Boston. He holds the prestigious Motoko and Gordon Deane Principal Chair of Boston's Atlantic Symphony Orchestra. He has premiered many works, including Samuel Barber's "Three Essays", "Three Sketches", "Fresh from West Chester" and "Fantasy for two pianos". The Boston Globe has described him as "one of the greatest hopes of music". Celebrating the bicentennial year of Franz Liszt, he released a recording with short miniatures for piano entitled "The Short Liszt" to a critical acclaim. He is the director of the Piano Summer Academy in Archanes Crete, Greece. In 2013 was appointed lecturer at Boston University College of Fine Arts.

Achievements
1996 Rachmaninoff Piano Competition in Moscow 
2000 Barber Foundation Achievement Award
First pianist to receive the Yannis Vardinoyannis Award
Esther & Albert Kahn Award.

Notes

References
New England Conservatory Faculty Profiles
Musipedia (in Greek)
The New Music
Konstantinos Papadakis official web-page

1972 births
Living people
Greek pianists
Musicians from Heraklion
Boston University College of Fine Arts alumni
New England Conservatory faculty
West Chester University faculty
21st-century pianists